Asia Town is a restaurant and event venue located at 24 Forces Avenue, in Old GRA, Rivers State. It opened to the public on 12 December 2012. The establishment has a seating capacity of 500 guests and serves mostly Chinese cuisine, Indian cuisine, Thai cuisine, and some Nigerian dishes. Asia Town also caters to weddings, birthdays, anniversaries, product launches and fashion shows.

See also

List of Chinese restaurants

References

External links 
Official Website
 

Old GRA, Port Harcourt
2010s establishments in Rivers State
Asian-Nigerian culture in Rivers State
Chinese restaurants outside China
Landmarks in Port Harcourt
Buildings and structures in Port Harcourt
Restaurants in Rivers State
Tourism in Port Harcourt
Companies based in Port Harcourt
Nigerian cuisine
Restaurants established in 2012
Entertainment venues in Port Harcourt
Nigerian companies established in 2012